The 2012 Northern European Gymnastics Championships was an artistic gymnastics competition held in the city of Glasgow in Scotland, United Kingdom. The event was held between 20 and 21 October at the Emirates Arena.

Medalists

References 

Northern European Gymnastics Championships
Northern European Gymnastics Championships
Northern European Gymnastics Championships
Northern European Gymnastics Championships